Meinardus Glacier is an extensive glacier in Palmer Land, Antarctica. It flows in an east-northeast direction to a point immediately east of Mount Barkow, where it is joined from the northwest by Haines Glacier, and then flows east to enter New Bedford Inlet close west of Court Nunatak, on the east coast of Palmer Land. The glacier was discovered and photographed from the air in December 1940 by the United States Antarctic Service. During 1947 it was photographed from the air by the Ronne Antarctic Research Expedition under Finn Ronne, who in conjunction with the Falkland Islands Dependencies Survey (FIDS) charted it from the ground. It was named by the FIDS for Wilhelm Meinardus, a German meteorologist and climatologist and author of many publications including the meteorological results of the German Antarctic Expedition under Drygalski, 1901–03.

See also
Mount Grimminger, standing on north side of Meinardus Glacier

References

External links

Glaciers of Palmer Land